Zeuxia is a genus of flies in the family Tachinidae.

Species
Zeuxia aberrans (Loew, 1847)
Zeuxia antoniae Tschorsnig, 1984
Zeuxia brevicornis (Egger, 1860)
Zeuxia cinerea Meigen, 1826
Zeuxia dahurica Kolomiets, 1971
Zeuxia elegans Mesnil, 1963
Zeuxia erythraea (Egger, 1856)
Zeuxia mongolica Richter, 1974
Zeuxia montivaga Kolomiets, 1971
Zeuxia nudigena Belanovsky, 1951
Zeuxia roederi (Villeneuve, 1932)
Zeuxia rubrapex Mesnil, 1963
Zeuxia sicardi Villeneuve, 1920
Zeuxia subapennina Rondani, 1862
Zeuxia tessellata Egger, 1860
Zeuxia tricolor (Portschinsky, 1881)
Zeuxia zejana Kolomiets, 1971
Zeuxia zernyi Mesnil, 1963

References

Dexiinae
Diptera of Europe
Diptera of Asia
Tachinidae genera
Taxa named by Johann Wilhelm Meigen